Omiodes nipponalis is a moth in the family Crambidae. It was described by Hiroshi Yamanaka in 2005. It is found in Japan (Kyushu) and China.

References

Moths described in 2005
nipponalis